Once in a While is the fifth studio album by American actor and singer Seth MacFarlane, released on April 19, 2019, by Republic Records and Verve Records. The record was primarily produced by Joel McNeely and MacFarlane himself, who also serves as the executive producer. The lead single from the album, "Half As Lovely (Twice As True)", was released digitally on April 11, 2019.

Background
On March 8, 2019, MacFarlane revealed on his Twitter account that he had just finished recording his new album at Abbey Road Studios. It was also announced that for the first time, MacFarlane would be working with Andrew Cottee as the composer and arranger instead of Joel McNeely, however he still remained a producer for the album. MacFarlane has a close relationship with the composer, since meeting on the 2016 animated musical film Sing and later working together on The Orville. MacFarlane described the album as a moody style of Sinatra's signature albums. "I love the ballad album, the rich, melancholy songs," MacFarlane said. "You're taking a theme or a mood or a tone or an emotion and assembling a set list where everything lives in that space, so when you put it on, you're spending the 60 minutes or however long the album is immersed in that one emotion." Cottee also described the album as "not necessarily sad break-up songs. They're more reflective, thoughtful, even philosophical, but they're not all torch songs."

Critical reception 

The Straits Times gave the album a positive review while also saying that MacFarlane should shake things up to make his music more fresh. Jazz Weeklys George W. Harris praised the album and MacFarlane himself, saying, "but it wouldn't work unless MacFarlane didn't have a strong enough voice to convince, and he does. He sounds convincing, assured and personal."

Track listing

Personnel 
Credits adapted from AllMusic.

 Jonathan Aasgaard – Cello
John Anderson – Oboe
John Barrett – Assistant Engineer
Chuck Berghofer – Bass
Irving Berlin – Composer
Anna-Liisa Bezrodny – Violin
Adrian Bradbury – Cello
Rich Breen – Engineer, Mixing
Benjamin Buckton – Violin
Sammy Cahn – Composer
Gordon Campbell – Trombone
Rebecca Chambers – Viola
Corinne Chappelle – Violin
Stephano Civetta – Assistant Engineer
Dave Collins – Mastering
Betty Comden – Composer
Andrew Cottee – Arranger, Conductor
Kris Crawford – Assistant Engineer
Tom Croxon – Orchestra Contractor
Hannah Dawson – Violin
Rudi DeGroote – Cello
Shlomy Dobrinsky – Violin
Kira Doherty – French Horn
Pierre Doumenge – Cello
Dream Town Orchestra – Orchestration
Clare Duckworth – Violin
Michael Edwards – Composer
Peter Erskine – Drums
Joy Fehily – Executive Producer
Carl Fischer – Composer
Sammy Gallop – Composer
Ian Gibbs – Violin
Tim Gibbs – Bass
Thomas Goodman – Bass
Mark Graham – Music Preparation
Peter Graham – Violin
Adolph Green – Composer
Bud Green – Composer
Thelma Handy – Violin
Philip Harmer – Oboe
Lorenz Hart – Composer
Andrew Harvey – Violin
Richard Harwood – Cello
Oliver Heath – Violin
Cormac Henry – Flute
Dan Higgins – Clarinet, Sax (Alto)
Jeremy Isaac – Violin
Maya Iwabuchi – Violin
Paul James – Composer
Magnus Johnston – Violin
Cerys Jones – Violin
Francis Kefford – Viola
Liam Kirkman – Trombone
Larry Koonse – Guitars
Nicholas Korth – French Horn
Frankie Laine – Composer
Dunja Lavrova – Violin
Peggy Lee – Composer
Mike Lovatt – Trumpet
James Lynch – Trumpet
Seth MacFarlane – Art Direction, Liner Notes, Primary Artist, Producer, Vocals
Ciaran McCabe – Violin
Joel McNeely – Producer
Johnny Mercer – Composer
John Mills – Violin
Kate Musker – Viola
Alex Neal – Percussion
Benjamin Newton – Viola
Peter North – Trombone
Simon Oliver – Bass
John Parricelli – Guitars
Fiona Paterson – Flute
Julie Pryce – Bassoon
Matthew Quenby – Viola
Tom Ranier – Piano
Edward C. Redding – Composer
Richard Rodgers – Composer
Ruth Rogers – Violin
Ben Rogerson – Cello
Laura Samuel – Violin
Victor Schertzinger – Composer
Bill Sienkiewicz – Illustrations
Kristen Sorace – Design
Lew Spence – Composer
Joe Spix – Art Direction
Jill Streater – Librarian
Jule Styne – Composer
Kay Swift – Composer
Laurence Ungless – Bass
Sam Walton – Percussion
Vicci Wardman – Viola
Hugh Webb – Harp
Natalie Weber – A&R
Claire Webster – Bassoon
Hubie Wheeler – Composer
Michael Whight – Clarinet
Pat White – Trumpet
Alec Wilder – Composer
Steven Wilkie – Violin

Charts
Once in a While debuted at No. 5 on the US Billboard Top Jazz Albums.

Release history

References

External links

 

2019 albums
Albums produced by Joel McNeely
Big band albums
Covers albums
Easy listening albums
Jazz albums by American artists
Seth MacFarlane albums
Republic Records albums
Verve Records albums